Las Piedras (which means "The Stones") is a suburb of Bella Unión in the Artigas Department of northern Uruguay.

Geography
Las Piedras, Franquia and Cuareim are located on a protruding part of land between Uruguay River and the mouth of Río Cuareim, where the international boundaries of Uruguay, Argentina and Brazil meet.

The suburb is located on Route 3 and borders the urban area of the city to the south, suburb Franquia to the north and suburb Cuareim to the west.

Population
In 2011 it had a population of 2,771.
 
Source: Instituto Nacional de Estadística de Uruguay

References

External links
INE map of Bella Unión, Coronado, Las Piedras and Portones de Hierro y Campodónico

Populated places in the Artigas Department